"Icy Grl" (pronounced "icy girl") is a song by American rapper Saweetie. It was first released through SoundCloud in 2017, before being released on October 2, 2017 as her debut commercial single and the lead single from her debut EP High Maintenance (2018). The song is a freestyle to "My Neck, My Back (Lick It)" by Khia.

Background
Around the time she wrote the song, Saweetie had been renting rooms from Craigslist. She stated that she penned the lyrics in one such room that had nothing but a mattress. Unhappy with her state of affairs, Saweetie wrote about the person she wanted to be in the song to motivate herself.

Before her rise to fame, she posted videos of herself rapping in her car on Instagram. One of the videos featured Saweetie performing a freestyle rap to the beat "My Neck, My Back (Lick It)" by Khia, which she released on SoundCloud as well. It went viral on the Internet in the summer of 2017 and became her breakout single.

Content
In the song, Saweetie raps about her goals in life and the person she wants to be in the future, as well as taking aim at her haters.

Music video
A music video for the song was released in October 2017. It finds Saweetie hanging out inside of a mansion surrounded by palm trees.

Remix
The official remix of the song was released on April 28, 2018 and is dubbed the "Bae Mix". It features vocals from American singer Kehlani, who performs a rap verse on the track, as well as a new verse from Saweetie.

Charts

Certifications

References

2017 songs
2017 debut singles
Saweetie songs
Songs written by Saweetie
Warner Records singles